Jeremiah Owusu-Koramoah (born November 4, 1999) is an American football linebacker for the Cleveland Browns of the National Football League (NFL). He played college football at Notre Dame, where he won the Butkus Award and was named the ACC Defensive Player of the Year and a unanimous All-American as a senior in 2020. Owusu-Koramoah was drafted by the Browns in the second round of the 2021 NFL Draft.

Early life and high school
Owusu-Koramoah grew up in Hampton, Virginia,and attended Bethel High School. He is of Ghanaian descent through his father Andrew, who met his wife Beverly in England, before moving to Virginia in 1998. Owusu-Koramoah was rated a three-star recruit and initially committed to play college football at the University of Virginia in 2016 before decommitting to choose Notre Dame.

College career
Owusu-Koramoah spent his freshman season on Notre Dame's scout team and did not appear in any games. He missed most of his sophomore year after breaking his foot in practice after playing in the first two games of the season. Owusu-Koramoah was named a starter going into his junior season and recorded 80 tackles, a team-leading 13.5 tackles for loss, and 5.5 sacks with four passes broken up, two forced fumbles, and two fumble recoveries. He won the Butkus Award as the nation's top linebacker as a senior in 2020, in addition to being named a unanimous All-American and the ACC Defensive Player of the Year.

Statistics

Professional career

Owusu-Koramoah was selected by the Cleveland Browns in the second round (52nd overall) of the 2021 NFL Draft. He signed his four-year rookie contract, worth $6.5 million, on June 6, 2021. He was placed on the team's COVID-19 reserve list at the start of training camp before being activated on August 3. Koramoah recorded his first career sack on Chicago Bears quarterback Justin Fields in Week 3 of the 2021 season. He was placed on injured reserve on October 19, 2021 with an ankle injury. He was activated on November 13. He was placed back on injured reserve on December 13 after suffering a foot injury in Week 14.

NFL career statistics

Regular season

Personal life
Jeremiah Owusu-Koramoah is of Ghanaian descent. In 2022, he was running a football camp in Ghana for the youth. His older brother, Joshua Emmanuel Owusu-Koramoah, was found dead inside a burned house on April 5, 2022. Two days later, police in Hampton, Virginia, said Ronald Ivan Scott has been charged with one count of murder and one count of arson.

References

External links
 Cleveland Browns bio
 Notre Dame Fighting Irish bio

1999 births
Living people
Players of American football from Virginia
American football linebackers
Notre Dame Fighting Irish football players
Sportspeople from Hampton, Virginia
All-American college football players
Cleveland Browns players
American sportspeople of Ghanaian descent